"La La La (Never Give It Up)" is the debut single by Swedish singer and songwriter September. It was released on 2 June 2003 on Stockholm Records and is featured on September's self-titled debut album, released in 2004. "La La La (Never Give It Up)" peaked at No. 8 on the Swedish single chart. As of December 2007, it is ranked as No. 653 on Best place of all time on the Swedish charts.

Track listing
CD single
 "La La La (Never Give It Up)" (Radio Version)  – 3:18
 "La La La (Never Give It Up)" (Extended Version)  – 5:52

CD maxi-single and digital download
 "La La La (Never Give It Up)" (Radio Version)  – 3:18
 "La La La (Never Give It Up)" (Extended Version)  – 5:52
 "La La La (Never Give It Up)" (Soulful Disco Mix Short)  – 3:24
 "La La La (Never Give It Up)" (Soulful Disco Mix Long)  – 5:07

Charts

Weekly charts

Year-end charts

References

2003 songs
2003 debut singles
Petra Marklund songs
Songs written by Jonas von der Burg
Songs written by Anoo Bhagavan
Songs written by Niklas von der Burg
Stockholm Records singles